Yrjö Rafael Ekqvist (10 November 1898 – 20 November 1973) was a Finnish track and field athlete who competed in the 1924 Summer Olympics. He was born in Ekenäs and died in Perniö. In 1924 he finished fourth in the javelin throw competition.

References

External links
profile

1898 births
1973 deaths
People from Raseborg
Finnish male javelin throwers
Olympic athletes of Finland
Athletes (track and field) at the 1924 Summer Olympics
Sportspeople from Uusimaa